Akysis recavus is a species of fish in the family Akysidae, the stream catfishes. It is native to Thailand, where it occurs in the Chao Phraya River. It has also been reported from the Mekong basin in Laos.

Akysis recavus is a small catfish, reaching 4 cm (1.6 inches) in standard length.

This fish was described to science by H. H. Ng and M. Kottelat in 1998. Little is known about the biology of the species.

References

External links
Akysis recavus. Florida Museum of Natural History.

Akysidae
Fish of Thailand
Fish described in 1998